Adrian Popa (born 24 July 1988) is a Romanian professional footballer who plays as a winger for Liga II club CSA Steaua București. His nickname is "Motoreta" which means Motorbike due to his speed.

Club career

Early years
Popa was one of the most proficient players of the Politehnica Timișoara reserve team, and was loaned to CS Buftea and Gloria Buzău.

Universitatea Cluj
In July 2009, Popa signed a contract with Universitatea Cluj. Although he showed impressive skills and helped the team get promoted to the first division, he left the club after one year.

Concordia Chiajna
In 2010, Popa joined Concordia Chiajna. He contributed to the club's promotion to the first division and was kept for the following season.

FCSB
On 15 August 2012, Popa signed a five-year contract with FCSB for an undisclosed transfer fee. One week later, he scored his first goal for the club in a 2–0 away win over FK Ekranas in the Europa League play-off round's first leg.

He played over 200 games during his spell with the capital-based club.

Reading
On 27 January 2017, it was announced that Popa agreed to transfer to English team Reading after reaching the final six months of his contract with FCSB. The transfer was made official three days later, with Popa signing with Reading until the summer of 2020.

His first goal came on 17 March 2017, scoring Reading's second in injury time in a 2–0 win over Sheffield Wednesday at the Hillsborough Stadium.

Loan to Al-Taawon
On 29 January 2018, Reading confirmed that Popa had joined Saudi Arabian side Al-Taawon on loan until the end of the 2017–18 season.

Loan to Ludogorets Razgrad
On 20 December 2018, Reading announced that Popa had moved to Ludogorets Razgrad on loan for the rest of the 2018–19 season.

Voluntari
On 16 October 2020, Popa signed a one-year contract with FC Voluntari.

Steaua București
On 22 September 2021, Popa signed a two-year contract with his childhood team, Steaua București.

International career
Popa made his debut for the Romania senior team in October 2012, in a 2014 FIFA World Cup qualification match against Netherlands.

Career statistics

Club

International

International goals
 (Romania score listed first, score column indicates score after each Popa goal)

Honours

Club
FCSB
Liga I: 2012–13, 2013–14, 2014–15
Cupa României: 2014–15, 2019–20
Cupa Ligii: 2014–15, 2015–16
Supercupa României: 2013
Ludogorets
First Professional Football League: 2018–19

References

External links

 
 
 

1988 births
Footballers from Bucharest
Living people
Romanian footballers
Association football midfielders
Liga I players
Liga II players
LPS HD Clinceni players
FC Gloria Buzău players
FC Universitatea Cluj players
CS Concordia Chiajna players
FC Steaua București players
FC Voluntari players
CSA Steaua București footballers
English Football League players
Reading F.C. players
Romania international footballers
UEFA Euro 2016 players
Romanian expatriate footballers
Expatriate footballers in England
Romanian expatriate sportspeople in England
Al-Taawoun FC players
Saudi Professional League players
Expatriate footballers in Saudi Arabia
Romanian expatriate sportspeople in Saudi Arabia
PFC Ludogorets Razgrad players
First Professional Football League (Bulgaria) players
Expatriate footballers in Bulgaria
Romanian expatriate sportspeople in Bulgaria